Kunal Kapoor may refer to:

 Kunal Kapoor (actor, born 1959), Indian film actor
 Kunal Kapoor (actor, born 1977), Indian actor, writer and entrepreneur
 Kunal Kapoor (cricketer) (born 1987), Indian cricketer
 Kunal Karan Kapoor (born 1982), Indian actor

See also
 Kunaal Roy Kapur (born 1979), Indian film actor and director
 Kunal Kapur, Indian celebrity chef and restaurateur